Erin Gemmell (born December 2, 2004) is an American competitive swimmer. She is an American record holder in the short course 4×200 meter freestyle relay. In the 200 metre freestyle, she won the gold medal at the 2022 Junior Pan Pacific Championships and placed fourth at the 2022 World Short Course Championships. In the 400 meter freestyle, she won the gold medal at the 2022 Junior Pan Pacific Championships, the 2022 US National title, and placed sixth at the 2022 World Short Course Championships. For the 4×200 meter freestyle relay, she won a bronze medal at the 2022 World Short Course Championships as well as gold medals at the 2019 World Junior Championships and 2022 Junior Pan Pacific Championships, swimming on the finals relay at each competition.

Background
Gemmell was born December 2, 2004, in the United States. Her mother, Barbara, was a competitive swimmer, her father, Bruce, is a swim coach, and her brother, Andrew, is also a competitive swimmer. She attends Stone Ridge School of the Sacred Heart in Bethesda, Maryland, where she competes as part of the school swim team. For collegiate swimming, she signed to compete for the University of Texas swim team starting in the autumn of 2023.

Career

2019–2021

2019 World Junior Championships

At the 2019 FINA World Junior Swimming Championships, held at Danube Arena in Budapest, Hungary, Gemmell won two gold medals, the first of which was in the 4×200 meter freestyle relay where she swam on both the prelims and the finals relay, splitting a 1:59.70 for the second leg of the relay in the final to help finish in 7:55.49, and the second of which was in the 4×100 meter freestyle relay where she contributed a split time of 55.52 seconds in the preliminaries before the finals relay finished in a time of 3:37.61 to place first.

2021 Swimming World Cup
For the first stop of the 2021 FINA Swimming World Cup held in Berlin, Germany, Gemmell won the bronze medal in the 400 meter freestyle with a time of 4:05.61 to finish over five seconds behind gold medalist Isabel Gose of Germany. One stop later, in Budapest, Hungary, she improved upon her time, swimming a personal best of 4:03.28 to place fourth. She also won the bronze medal in the 200 meter freestyle, finishing less than two seconds behind gold medalist Madison Wilson of Australia and silver medalist Katja Fain of Slovenia with a personal best time of 1:55.04.

2022

2022 US International Team Trials
In April, at the 2022 USA Swimming International Team Trials in Greensboro, Gemmell swam 2022 Junior Pan Pacific Swimming Championships qualifying times in the 200 meter freestyle, a 1:58.12, and the 400 meter freestyle, a 4:13.63, and was named to the United States roster in both events. Three months later, in July at the 2022 US National Swimming Championships in Irvine, she won the silver medal in the 200 meter freestyle with a personal best time of 1:56.14, finishing 1.64 seconds behind gold medalist Katie Ledecky. Two days later at the Championships, she won the national title and gold medal in the 400 meter freestyle with a personal best time of 4:06.17.

2022 Junior Pan Pacific Championships

Starting off the 2022 Junior Pan Pacific Swimming Championships on day one, held at Veterans Memorial Aquatic Center in Honolulu in August, Gemmell won the gold medal in the 200 meter freestyle with a Championships record time of 1:56.15 in the final after setting a new Championships record of 1:56.66 in the preliminaries of event to qualify for the final ranking first. The following morning, she set a new Championships record of 54.42 seconds in the preliminaries of the 100 meter freestyle, lowering the previous mark of 54.47 seconds set by Gretchen Walsh in 2018, and qualifying for the final. She lowered her Championships record and personal best time to 54.13 seconds in the final, winning the gold medal. For her final event of the day, the 4×200 meter freestyle relay, she anchored the relay to a first-place finish with a 1:54.86, helping achieve a new Championships record of 7:54.70.

Day three, Gemmell ranked first overall in the preliminaries of the 400 meter freestyle with a time of 4:08.53 and qualified for the final. Finishing in a personal best time of 4:05.07 in the final, she won the gold medal and set a new Championships record in the event, lowering the record over two full seconds from the former mark of 4:07.10 set in 2012 by Leah Smith. For her final event of the evening, she helped win the gold medal in the 4×100 meter freestyle relay in a Championships record time of 3:37.99, splitting a 54.29 for the third leg of the relay. On the morning of day four, she swam a personal best time of 25.42 seconds in the 50 meter freestyle preliminary heats and qualified for the final ranking second. In the evening final, she finished in a time of 25.46 seconds to win the bronze medal, finishing 0.27 seconds behind gold medalist Milla Jansen of Australia. In her final event of the Championships, she split a 53.73 for the freestyle leg of the 4×100 meter medley relay to help win the gold medal in a Championships record time of 4:02.14.

After earning points for each of her placings in her individual events throughout the Championships, Gemmell ranked as the highest scoring female, and overall, swimmer with thirty-three points, which was five points ahead of the highest scoring male swimmer, Joshua Staples of Australia.

2022 Swimming World Cup
For her second FINA Swimming World Cup, Gemmell started off with a personal best time of 4:01.35 in the preliminary heats of the 400 meter freestyle at the 2022 FINA Swimming World Cup in Indianapolis, dropping 1.93 seconds from her former previous best time and qualifying for the final ranking third. Later the same morning, she placed twelfth in the 50 meter freestyle with a personal best time of 24.98 seconds. She improved upon her personal best time in the 400 meter freestyle evening final, winning the bronze medal with a time of 4:00.45. The next morning, she ranked fifth in the preliminary heats of the 200 meter freestyle, qualifying for the final with a personal best time of 1:54.31. She dropped an additional 1.04 seconds off her personal best time in the evening final, placing sixth with a time of 1:53.27. The following morning, she swam a personal best time of 53.14 seconds in the preliminary heats of the 100 meter freestyle, taking 2.42 seconds off her previous personal best time of 55.56 seconds and qualifying for the final ranking eighth. For the evening final, she placed seventh, lowering her personal best time to 52.97 seconds.

2022 World Short Course Championships

In October, Gemmell was announced as a member of the Team USA roster for the 2022 World Short Course Championships, in December in Melbourne, Australia, in the 200 meter freestyle and 400 meter freestyle. It marked her first time being named to a senior World Championships roster. On December 2, and leading up to the World Short Course Championships, she won the silver medal in the 200 meter freestyle at the 2022 U.S. Open Swimming Championships with a time of 1:57.16.

On the morning of day one, Gemmell ranked third in the preliminaries of the 400 meter freestyle with a 4:00.49 and qualified for the final. Later in the preliminaries, she split a 52.84 for the second leg of the 4×100 meter freestyle relay, helping qualify the relay for the final ranking fourth with a time of 3:31.11. At 18 years of age in the first World Championships individual final of her career, in any course and any age level, she placed sixth in the 400 meter freestyle with a time of 4:01.82. For the 4×100 meter freestyle finals relay, Kate Douglass substituted in for her and all relay members won a silver medal when the finals relay placed second in 3:26.29. The second day of competition, she won a bronze medal in the 4×200 meter freestyle relay, contributing a split time of 1:52.23 for the third leg, the fastest time amongst her finals relay teammates by over one full second, to the final time of 7:34.70, which was a new American record in the event.

For the third morning preliminaries, Gemmell contributed a 24.34 for the second leg of the 4×50 meter freestyle relay to help qualify for the final ranking third. The finals relay, for which she was substituted out, went on the finish first in 1:33.89 and she won a gold medal with the rest of the prelims and finals relay members for her efforts in the preliminaries. In the preliminaries on the sixth and final day, she qualified for the final of the 200 meter freestyle with a time of 1:53.47 and overall third-rank. In the evening finals session, she placed fourth with a personal best time of 1:52.56.

2023
At the 2023 Metro Championships in February in Boyds, Maryland, Gemmell contributed to an overall win for her school's team, Stone Ridge, with a new competition record and personal best time of 1:43.45 in the 200 yard freestyle that won the event, and a personal best time of 48.19 seconds in the 100 yard freestyle that won her the title in that event as well.

International championships (50 m)

 Gemmell swam only in the preliminary heats.

International championships (25 m)

 Gemmell swam only in the preliminary heats.

Personal best times

Long course meters (50 m pool)

Legend: h – preliminary heat

Short course meters (25 m pool)

Legend: h – preliminary heat

Short course yards (25 yd pool)

Swimming World Cup circuits
The following medals Gemmell has won at Swimming World Cup circuits.

National records

Short course meters (25 m pool)

References

External links
 

2004 births
Living people
Swimmers from Maryland
American female freestyle swimmers
21st-century American women
Medalists at the FINA World Swimming Championships (25 m)